Enrico Mylius Dalgas K.1 D.M. F.M.I (16 July 1828 – 16 April 1894) was a Danish engineer who pioneered the soil melioration of Jutland.

Early life and family 
Dalgas was born on 16 July 1828 in Naples, where his father Jean Antoine was the Danish consul. He was baptised Heinrich D. Dalgas. His mother Johanne Tomine née Stibolt was the daughter of a Danish naval officer from a distinguished family. Jean Antoine was descended from Huguenots who settled in Switzerland after the edict of Fontainebleau, whence his grandfather Antoine settled in Denmark. His brother, Carlo Dalgas, was a noted animal artist. When he was 7, his father died and his mother brought him back to Denmark.

Career 
Dalgas joined the Danish Army as an officer of the Engineer Corps (today the Ingeniørregimentet). He mostly served as a highway engineer, reaching the rank of Lieutenant Colonel before he moved to the newly established civilian body of the Highway Authority. He also served as a pioneer officer during the First and Second Schleswig Wars, during which two of his brothers died.

Soil melioration and related work 
Dalgas applied the knowledge and skills he gained as a military engineer toward the reclamation and afforestation of western Jutland. After Denmark's defeat in the Schleswig wars and the ensuing loss of territory, the removal of hardpan was considered a national priority. Working on roads across Jutland gave him an intimate knowledge of the different soils present in Denmark, and the organisational skill he gained as a military officer and civil servant helped him manage large planting and forestry projects. As he performed assessments of road damage, he got to know locals and learn about their concerns, gaining knowledge as well as many allies who helped him in his endeavours. Dalgas was among the leading forces behind the planting of heaths, for while they had been cultivated before, their widespread planting was an innovation that required much more organization.

In 1867, Dalgas founded the Danish Heath Society (Hedeselskabet), with jurist Georg Morville and prominent Jutish landowner Ferdinand Mourier-Petersen. It later added a branch in northern Germany, the Haide-Cultur-Verein. Dalgas wrote a number of books on land improvement, forestry, and the natural history of forests and heaths, as well as many pamphlets, and articles published in academic and popular periodicals on a wide range of topics, including agricultural science, mycology, and entomology. Dalgas's work was later used by German soil scientist Carl Emeis (among the founders of the Haide-Cultur-Verein) as the basis for his theory on hardpan and heaths, the first work to explain the role of humic acids in soil.

Personal life 
In 1855 Dalgas married Marie Magdalene Christiane Købke, daughter of Lieutenant Colonel Niels Christian Købke. On 16 April 1894, Dalgas died in Aarhus. They had at least one daughter, Ellen Margareth, who emigrated to Brazil and was the mother of engineer and naturalist Johan Dalgas Frisch.

Honours 
Enrico Dalgas was made a Knight of the Order of the Dannebrog in 1864, received the Cross of Honour of the Order of the Dannebrog in 1867, received the Medal of Merit in Gold in 1875, and was made Commander 1st Class of the Dannebrog in 1887. Dalgas Avenue in Aarhus, Dalgasgade in Herning and Dalgas Boulevard in Copenhagen are named after him, and a number of Danish cities have erected statues of him.

Bibliography 
 Oversigt over hederne i Jylland, 1866
 Geografiske billeder I og II, 1867–68
 Vejledning til træplantning, 1871
 Den dybe reolpløjning, 1872
 En hederejse i Hannover, 1873
 Anvisning til anlæg af småplantninger, 1875–83
 Hedemoser og Kærjorder, 1876
 Om engvandring, 1877
 Om plantning i Jylland, 1877
 Hederne og deres Kultivering, 1878

References 

1828 births
1894 deaths
Soil scientists
Foresters
Danish naturalists
Danish military engineers
Danish military officers
Danish conservationists
Danish civil servants
Environmental engineers
19th-century Danish scientists
Recipients of the Cross of Honour of the Order of the Dannebrog
Commanders First Class of the Order of the Dannebrog
Recipients of the Medal of Merit (Denmark)
Danish agronomists
Burials at Nordre Cemetery
Danish civil engineers
19th-century Neapolitan people
19th-century engineers
19th-century Danish military personnel